"Jos mä oon oikee" (English: If I'm real) song by Finnish singer-songwriter Sanni and the second single from her debut studio album Sotke mut. It was released on 18 June 2013 through Warner Music Finland. The song's music video was published on 4 July 2013 and was filmed in Helsinki. The song peaked at number nineteen on Finland's airplay and downloads charts, but did not chart on their singles chart.

Charts

Weekly charts

References

2013 songs
2013 singles
Sanni (singer) songs
Warner Music Group singles